The TCL 10 5G, which was announced on 6 April 2020, is an Android-based smartphone manufactured by TCL, as part of its fifth-generation TCL 10 series lineup. The TCL 10 5G features a durable dual side glass back with a "light-catching metallic gradient”.

Specifications

Hardware
TCL 10 5G  is powered by a Qualcomm 765G chipset and Adreno 620 GPU, equipped with a 128 GB internal storage, and supports micro SDXC card up to 1TB. It operates on TCL UI, a customized version of Android 10.TCL 10 5G has a 16MP front camera and 4 rear cameras: 64MP (f/1.89)+8MP (f/2.2)+5MP (f/2.2)+2MP (f/2.4). It measures 163.65 x 76.56 x 9.05mm and weighs 210 g. TCL 10 5G has a non removable Li-Po Battery rated at 4500mAH and is powered by 9V2A Quick Charger 3.0. It is equipped with sensors including A-GPS, BeiDou, Galileo, Global Navigation Satellite System, GPS (GPS L1+L5 support), Quasi-Zenith Satellite System, accelerometer, E-Compass, gyro sensor, proximity sensor, and RGB light sensor.

Memory
TCL 10 5G has 6 GB of RAM and 128 GB of built in memory and a dedicated Micro SDXC card slot which supports up to 1024 GB of additional storage.

Display
TCL 10 5G has a 6.53-inch FHD+ Dotch™ LCD display (1080 x 2340 pixels), and a pixel density of 395PPI, with screen to body ratio of 91%.

Battery
TCL 10 5G is equipped with a non removable 4500 mAH Li-Po battery, powered by 9V2A Quick Charger 3.0.

Camera
The TCL 10 5G is equipped with 4 rear cameras which including a 64MP camera with f/1.89 aperture, a 8MP camera with f/2.2 aperture, a 5MP camera with f/2.2 aperture, and a 2MP camera with f/2.4 aperture. It supports video capture of 720P & 1080P @60FPS, 720P, 1080P & 4K @30FPS, and slow motion video capture of 720P @960FPS, 1080P & 720P @240/120FPS. The phone’s camera features include auto zoom, super wide angle mode, super macro mode, and others. The front facing camera is 16MP with an f/2.2 aperture supporting features like face beautifications (photos), filters and support 720P & 1080P recording at 30fps.

Colors
TCL 10 5G is available in two colors chrome blue, and mercury gray.

Software
TCL 10 5G runs on TCL UI powered by Android 10.

Connectivity
TCL 10 5G has 5G connectivity.

References

Android (operating system) devices
Mobile phones introduced in 2020